Moses Ali (born 5 April 1939) is a Ugandan politician and retired military officer. He is the Second Deputy Prime Minister and Deputy Leader of Government Business in Parliament. He previously served in the Cabinet of Uganda as Third Deputy Prime Minister and Deputy Leader of Government Business from May 2011 until June 2016. He also served as the first First Deputy Prime Minister from June 2016 to May 2021. He has also been the elected Member of Parliament for East Moyo County in Adjumani District since 2011.

Background and education
Moses Ali hails from Adjumani District (former Madi District) in northern Uganda. He was born on 5 April 1939. He holds the degree of Bachelor of Laws (LLB), obtained from Makerere University. He also holds the Diploma in Legal Practice, from the Law Development Center in Kampala. Moses Ali also holds qualifications from military educational institutions in Uganda, Israel and the United Kingdom. He is a Muslim.

Career
Ali was involved in the 1971 Ugandan coup d'état that overthrew President Milton Obote and brought Idi Amin to power. He consequently rose in the ranks during the duration of the Second Republic of Uganda, when Amin ruled the country as military dictator. Ali was appointed Minister of Finance. Journalists Tony Avirgan and Martha Honey described Ali as one of Amin's "closest henchmen". As Minister of Finance, he used his position to organize an Islamic charity. This garnered him a lot of popular support, but also raised Amin's suspicions, as he feared Ali was attempting to construct a Muslim political base of support. Indeed, Ali gained many followers within the Uganda Army.

In April 1978, the President organized a meeting in the capital Kampala, where he railed against ministers whom he deemed disloyal, too powerful or incompetent, including Ali. Accusing the Minister of Finance of mismanaging the Bank of Uganda, gross corruption, mishandling Muslim Supreme Council funds, and ignoring orders by the government, Amin became so angry during his speech that he threw a trashcan at Ali. Having realized that his situation was untenable, Ali got away as soon as possible. He quietly snuck out of Kampala in his private car and fled to his home in the West Nile Region. When he got there, however, a group of hitmen attacked him, but he fended them off in a gunfight. Ali was convinced that his downfall and the attempted assassination had been organized by the Uganda Army commander Yusuf Gowon, a long-time rival of his. Amin subsequently stripped him of all of his military honours. However, Amin was still wary of Ali's large following, and only formally fired him from his ministerial portfolio in August 1978. Around October, ten SRB agents attempted to arrest Ali, but were killed.

When Amin's regime collapsed during the Uganda–Tanzania War of 1978–1979, Ali fled into exile in southern Sudan, finding refuge in Nimule. In the 1980s he led the Uganda National Rescue Front in an armed rebellion against the government of reinstated President Milton Obote, and became a warlord ruling a fief in southern Sudan. Among the insurgents of the early Ugandan Bush War, he waged the "most effective guerrilla campaign". Using his influence and military powers to his advantage, Ali eventually negotiated a favorable deal with Yoweri Museveni who took power as President at the Bush War's end in 1986. His forces were integrated into Uganda's new national army, the National Resistance Army which later became the Uganda People's Defence Force, and he was appointed a Major General. As a result of his powerful position in Uganda's new government and military, Ali became highly influential and quite wealthy.

Ali even rose to First Deputy Prime Minister in Museveni's government. He served in the Ugandan Parliament from 2001. He was further promoted to Lieutenant General on 13 March 2003, but lost both his parliamentary seat and his ministerial appointment in 2006. In 2011, at the age of 72, he regained his position in parliament and was assigned new cabinet responsibilities. In the next year, Ali was once again promoted to the rank of general in the Uganda People's Defence Force. In 2016, following his re-election to parliament, he was again appointed First Deputy Prime Minister and Deputy Leader of Government Business in Parliament.

See also
 Cabinet of Uganda
 Parliament of Uganda

References

Works cited

External links
 Profile At Unhcr.org
Full Cabinet List, May 2011

1939 births
Living people
Finance Ministers of Uganda
Ugandan military personnel
Ugandan rebels
20th-century Ugandan lawyers
Ugandan Muslims
Madi people
Government ministers of Uganda
People from Adjumani District
Law Development Centre alumni
Members of the Parliament of Uganda
Ugandan generals
People from West Nile sub-region
21st-century Ugandan politicians